Isotopocule is a shorthand for an isotopically substituted molecule. Isotopocules are molecules that differ only in their isotopic composition or the intramolecular position of the isotopes. It is an umbrella term for the more specific terms isotopologue and isotopomer, coined by Jan Kaiser and Thomas Röckmann in 2008.

References 

Isotopes
Physical chemistry